The following list shows the rates of adverse symptoms seen in people taking venlafaxine.

Very common (>10% incidence) 
 Headache — an often transient side effect that is common to most serotonin reuptake inhibitors and that most often occurs at the beginning of therapy or after a dose escalation.
 Nausea — an adverse effect that is more common with venlafaxine than with the SSRIs. Usually transient and less severe in those receiving the extended release formulations.
 Insomnia
 Asthenia (weakness)
 Dizziness
 Ejaculation disorder — sexual side effects can be seen with virtually any antidepressant, especially those that inhibit the reuptake of serotonin (including venlafaxine).
 Somnolence
 Dry mouth
 Sweating
Withdrawal

Common (1–10% incidence) 

 Constipation
 Nervousness
 Abnormal vision
 Anorgasmia
 Hypertension
 Impotence
 Paresthesia
 Tremor
 Vasodilation
 Vomiting
 Weight loss
 Chills
 Palpitations
 Confusion
 Depersonalisation
 Night sweats
 Menstrual disorders associated with increased bleeding or increased irregular bleeding (e.g. menorrhagia, metrorrhagia)
 Urinary frequency increased
 Abnormal dreams
 Decreased libido
 Increased muscle tonus
 Yawning
 Sweating
 Abnormality of accommodation
 Abnormal ejaculation/orgasm (males)
 Urinary hesitancy
 Serum cholesterol increased (especially when treatment is prolonged and it may be dose-dependent)

Uncommon (0.1-1% incidence) 

 Face edema
 Intentional injury (self-injury)
 Malaise
 Moniliasis
 Neck rigidity
 Pelvic pain
 Photosensitivity reaction
 Suicide attempt
 Withdrawal syndrome
 Hypotension
 Postural hypotension
 Syncope
 Tachycardia
 Bruxism
 Ecchymosis
 Mucous membrane bleeding
 Gastrointestinal bleeding
 Abnormal liver function tests
 Hyponatraemia
 Weight gain
 Apathy
 Hallucinations
 Myoclonus
 Rash
 Abnormal orgasm (females)
 Urinary retention (the inability to pass urine)
 Angioedema
 Agitation
 Impaired coordination & balance
 Alopecia (hair loss)
 Tinnitus (hearing bells)
 Proteinuria (protein in urine)

Rare (0.01–0.1% incidence) 
 Syndrome of inappropriate antidiuretic hormone secretion (SIADH)
 Thrombocytopenia
 Prolonged bleeding time
 Seizures
 Mania
 Neuroleptic malignant syndrome (NMS)
 Serotonin syndrome
 Akathisia/psychomotor restlessness
 Urinary incontinence

Very rare (<0.01% incidence) 

 Anaphylaxis
 QT prolongation
 Ventricular fibrillation
 Ventricular tachycardia (including torsades de pointes)
 Pancreatitis
 Blood dyscrasias (including agranulocytosis, aplastic anaemia, neutropenia and pancytopenia)
 Elevated serum prolactin
 Delirium
 Extrapyramidal reactions (including dystonia and dyskinesia)
 Tardive dyskinesia
 Pulmonary eosinophilia
 Erythema multiforme
 Stevens–Johnson syndrome
 Pruritus
 Urticaria
 Toxic epidermal necrolysis
 Angle closure glaucoma

References

Venlafaxine